The Chikugo-class destroyer escort (or frigate) was a class of destroyer escorts built by the Japanese Maritime Self-Defense Force as the successor of the , with the same ASW mission. This is the first Japanese destroyer escort class to carry ASROC anti-submarine missiles.

The class entered service with Chikugo in 1971. Eleven ships were constructed and saw service until the mid-1990s and early 2000s. All vessels in the class were retired with Noshiro being the last to decommission in 2003.

Design
The main anti-submarine weapon was changed from the M/50  ASW rocket launcher to the ASROC Anti-submarine missile. The octuple launcher for ASROC was stationed at the mid-deck, and the entire ship design was prescribed by this stationing. To exploit the range of ASROC, this class was equipped with the long-range low-frequency (5 kHz) bow sonar, OQS-3A (Japanese version of the AN/SQS-23), and in addition, the latter batch had SQS-35(J) Variable Depth Sonar system.

In contrast to their anti-submarine capability, the anti-aircraft fire power was weakened compared to the preceding class. The foredeck gun was a Type 68 3"/50 caliber twin cannon controlled by a FCS-1B Gun Fire Control System, which was standard anti-air weapon system in the JMSDF of this age. But the afterdeck gun was the old-fashioned Bofors 40 mm L/60 twin cannon, lacking the anti-ship missile defense (ASMD) capability. The final batch of this class was planned to equipped with the new Oerlikon 35 mm twin cannon, but this plan was frustrated because of the budgetary consideration.

Ships in the class

References

 
Frigate classes
Frigates of the Japan Maritime Self-Defense Force